Gravia may refer to:
 places in Greece (Greek Γραβιά):
 Gravia, Arta, a village in the Arta regional unit 
 Gravia, Karditsa, a village in the Karditsa regional unit
 Gravia, Preveza, a village in the Preveza regional unit
 Gravia, a town in Phocis
 other use
 Gravia (crustacean), an extinct crustacean genus in the order Palaeocopida